Sir Harry George Champion CIE  (17 August 1891 – 20 June 1979) was a Geographer and forest officer in British India who created a classification of the forest types of India and Burma.

He studied at New College, Oxford, and obtained a degree in chemistry in 1912 and then studied botany and forestry under William Schlich. He joined the Indian Forest Service in 1915 and became a silviculturist at the Forest Research Institute at Dehradun staying there until 1936 before becoming a Conservator in the United Provinces. He left India in 1939 and became a Professor of Forestry at Oxford, succeeding Robert Scott Troup. Troup had offered him a position at the Imperial Forestry Institute in 1924 but Champion chose not to join it. He married Troup's secretary Crystal Parsons.

Champion published an initial classification of the forest types of India and Burma in 1936. This was revised in 1968 by S K. Seth and this is referred to as the Champion and Seth classification of the forest types of India. His younger brother F. W. Champion was also a forester in India and a pioneer in wildlife photography.

References

External links
 

1891 births
1979 deaths
British foresters
British botanists
Alumni of New College, Oxford
Place of birth missing
Imperial Forestry Service officers
Academics of the University of Oxford
Companions of the Order of the Indian Empire
Knights Bachelor
British people in colonial India